Zhang Wei (born 16 May 2000) is a Chinese professional footballer who plays as a forward for Chinese Super League club Hebei F.C.

Club career
Zhang Wei was promoted to the senior team of Hebei China Fortune within the 2019 Chinese Super League season and would make his debut in a league game on 1 June 2019 against Guangzhou R&F F.C. in a 2-2 draw. On 28 July 2021, He scored his first senior goal in a 1-0 win over Dalian Professional.

Career statistics

References

External links

2000 births
Living people
Chinese footballers
Association football midfielders
Chinese Super League players
Hebei F.C. players